This article describes the qualifying results for 10 nominative spots (6 MAG, 4 WAG) earned through the FIG Artistic Gymnastics World Cup series for the 2020 Summer Olympics. It further describes the results for six non-nominative spots (3 MAG, 3WAG)  earned through the FIG Artistic Gymnastics World Cup All-Around series by nations who have qualified a for the team events at those Games.

Rules 
Gymnasts attempting to earn a nominative spot at the 2020 Summer Olympics earn points at the various Artistic Gymnastics World Cups and their top three placements count towards their total.  Whoever earns the highest total points at the end of the eight World Cups earns a guaranteed spot at the Olympics.  Only one athlete per NOC can earn a spot and the athlete can not have helped their NOC qualify a team spot through the 2018 or 2019 World Artistic Gymnastics Championships.

Gymnasts attempting to earn their nation a non-nominative spot at the 2020 Summer Olympics earn points at the 4 Artistic Gymnastics World Cup All-Around series events. Points earned count towards a national total.  The three nations earning the highest total points at the end of the four All-Around World Cups in men's and women's competition earn a fifth individual spot at the Olympics.

Below is the table showing how many points a gymnast earns at each competition, depending on their placement.

Nominative places

Non-nominative places

All-Around World Cup series results
As stated in the Olympic Qualification guidelines, a minimum of 3 and maximum of 4 All-Around World Cups must take place for the All-Around World Cup series to remain a valid path for qualification of an additional spot.  However, due to the fact that the Stuttgart, Birmingham, and Tokyo World Cups were canceled, the backup qualification allocation was to be executed:

However, in April 2020 the FIG announced that because the IOC has extended the qualification period until 29 June 2021, they will work with the organizing national federations to reschedule the canceled World Cups and proposed an amendment whereby the three best results out of four All-Around World Cups will be taken into consideration for Olympic qualification.

In February 2021, after both Stuttgart and Birmingham had once again canceled their respective World Cups, the FIG stated that because less than three World Cups took place, the unused places go to the highest-ranked countries in the team ranking results of the qualifications at the 2019 World Championships.  For men's artistic gymnastics this was Russia, China, and Japan.  For women's artistic gymnastics this was the US, China, and Russia.  In March the Tokyo World Cup was once again canceled as well.

Men's All-Around World Cup

Women's All-Around World Cup

Apparatus World Cup series results
Only the top ten athletes per apparatus are listed below.  The top 3 scores per athlete are bolded and the total column is the sum of the top 3 scores.

Even though the 2020 Baku World Cup was canceled due to the coronavirus pandemic, qualifications were completed before the event was canceled and the FIG ruled that the qualifying results would be used for Olympic qualification point distribution.

Women

Vault

Uneven bars

Balance beam

Floor exercise

Men

Floor exercise

Pommel horse

Still rings

Vault

Parallel bars

High bar

External links
 Full 2020 Qualification Standings
 FIG 2020 Women's Qualification Standings

References

Gymnastics at the 2020 Summer Olympics